Donald Herbert Houghton (2 February 1930 – 2 July 1991) was a British television screenwriter and producer.

Career
Born in Paris to Scottish parents, Houghton started writing for radio in 1951 before moving into film and television in 1958. In the 1970s, he was a primary writer for Hammer Films including for Dracula AD 1972, The Satanic Rites of Dracula, The Legend of the 7 Golden Vampires and Shatter.

His television work includes Doctor Who for which he wrote the serials Inferno (1970) and The Mind of Evil (1971), the fifth Sapphire & Steel television story (known informally as Dr McDee Must Die) co-written with Anthony Read, Emergency – Ward 10, Crossroads, Ace of Wands, New Scotland Yard, The Professionals and at least one episode of C.A.T.S. Eyes (1985).

Houghton created and wrote for the soap opera Take the High Road (1980). He also wrote three novels: Column of Thieves and Blood Brigade and Take the High Road: Summer's Gloaming.

Personal life
Houghton was married to actress Pik-Sen Lim. Their daughter Sara Houghton is also an actress.

Writing credits

References

Bibliography

External links

1930 births
1991 deaths
British male screenwriters
British film producers
British television writers
British science fiction writers
British horror writers
British male television writers
20th-century British male writers
20th-century British screenwriters
Take the High Road
20th-century British businesspeople